Alxa (Mongolian: Alaša) may refer to several places in Inner Mongolia, China:

Alxa League, prefecture-level division
Alxa Left Banner, county-level division
Alxa Right Banner, county-level division
Alxa Desert, a desert